Léon Georget (2 October 1879 – 5 November 1949) was a racing cyclist from Preuilly-sur-Claise, Indre-et-Loire, France. He was known as The Father of the Bol d'Or, having won the race nine times between 1903 and 1919 in Paris. He was also nicknamed Big Red or The Brute.

Léon's younger brother Émile was also a very successful cyclist, winning the Bordeaux–Paris and nine stages of the Tour de France. His son Pierre Georget won silver (1000 metres) and bronze medals (tandem) at the 1936 Summer Olympics.

Major results
 Bol d'Or 1903 1st
 Bol d'Or 1904 2nd
 Bol d'Or 1906 3rd
 Bol d'Or 1907 1st
 Bol d'Or 1908 1st
 Bol d'Or 1909 1st
 Bol d'Or 1910 1st
 Bol d'Or 1911 1st
 Bol d'Or 1912 1st
 Bol d'Or 1913 1st
 Bol d'Or 1919 1st
 Bol d'Or 1924 6th
 Brussels 24 hours, 1906 1st Tandem with Émile
 Six Days Toulouse: 1906 1st (with Émile)
 Bordeaux–Paris: 1903 2nd
 Bordeaux–Paris: 1910 3rd
 Six Days New York: 1907 3rd (teamed with Émile in 1906, 1909 and 1911)
 Tour de France: 1906 8th

References

1879 births
1949 deaths
Sportspeople from Indre-et-Loire
French male cyclists
Cyclists from Centre-Val de Loire